The 2020–21 Texas State Bobcats women's basketball team represented Texas State University during the 2020–21 NCAA Division I women's basketball season. The basketball team, led by tenth-year head coach Zenarae Antoine, played all home games at the Strahan Arena along with the Texas State Bobcats men's basketball team. They were members of the Sun Belt Conference.

Previous season 
The Bobcats finished the 2019–20 season 13–17, 6–12 in Sun Belt play to finish tenth in the conference. They made it to the 2019-20 Sun Belt Conference women's basketball tournament where they were defeated by UT Arlington in the First Round. Following the season, all conference tournaments as well as all postseason play was cancelled due to the COVID-19 pandemic.

Offseason

Departures

Transfers

Recruiting

Roster

Schedule and results

|-
!colspan=9 style=| Non-conference Regular Season
|-

|-
!colspan=9 style=| Conference Regular Season
|-

|-
!colspan=9 style=| Sun Belt Tournament

See also
 2020–21 Texas State Bobcats men's basketball team

References

Texas State Bobcats women's basketball seasons
Texas State Bobcats
Texas State Bobcats women's basketball
Texas State Bobcats women's basketball